Welk  is a village in the administrative district of Gmina Sierakowice, within Kartuzy County, Pomeranian Voivodeship, in northern Poland.

The village has a population of 104.

See also
History of Pomerania

References

Welk